Pluton (1980s – Pluton-M) is a system of deep space communications and planetary radar in Crimea. It was built in the Deep-Space Communication Center area Eighty-Fifth Radiotechnical Center of Distance Communications with Space Objects;;; near Yevpatoria in 1960, and consists of at least three antennas.  Three of them are of the ADU-1000 design, an assembly of eight reflector antennas, each with diameter of 16 metres.  At the North Station, two receiving antennas were built, and a transmitter was constructed 8.5 kilometres away at the South Station.

Each receiving dish has a Cassegrain system with subreflectors mounted on quadrapods in front of the dishes. The dishes were welded onto the hulls of two diesel submarines and laid down onto railway bridge trusses.  The  ADU-1000 antennas were mounted onto steerable frames constructed from battleship gun turrets and railway bridge trusses.

The Pluton complex supported all the Soviet space programs until 1978, when the Yevpatoria RT-70 radio telescope was built, then the Pluton became a backup system for the RT-70. The Pluton complex was the world's highest capacity deep space communication system prior to Goldstone in 1966.

In 1961 it performed one of the world's first radar detection of the planet Venus. In June 1962 it performed the world's first successful radar detection of the planet Mercury
. In February 1963 it performed  successful radar detection of the planet Mars. In September–October 1963 it performed  successful radar detection of the planet Jupiter.

On the 19th and the 24th of November 1962, the words  «MIR», «LENIN», and «SSSR» were sent in the direction of the star HD131336 in the constellation Libra. These messages (The Morse Message (1962)) are the first radio broadcasts for extraterrestrial civilizations in the history of mankind.

The first Westerner to visit the site was British radio astronomer Bernard Lovell, the Director of the Jodrell Bank Observatory. In 2009, Lovell told The Daily Telegraph that he had developed radiation sickness after the 1963 visit, which he believed was a deliberate attempt by the Soviet authorities, who knew Jodrell Bank was part of the British early-warning system, to assassinate him.

Sometime around November 11, 2013, one (transmitter) of the three antennas was dismantled.

Missions 
As Deep space communication system:
 Venera-1,-2,-3,-4,-5,-6.-7.-9,-10,-11,-12
 Mars-2,-3,-4,-5,-6,-7
 1995–2000 –  Interball-1
 November 16, 1996 – Mars 96.

As Planetary radar:
 1961 April 18 and 26 – radiolocation of the planet Venus.  However the initial value of the AU deduced, and the time for the planet to rotate, were incorrect.  These were later corrected to agree with other groups.
 June 1962, after increasing the sensitivity of the receiving equipment – the world's first radiolocation of the planet Mercury.
 October–November 1962 – second radar study of Venus.
 February 1963 – radiolocation of the planet Mars.
 September–October 1963 – radiolocation of the planet Jupiter.

Radio Astronomy:
 April 1964 – study Crab Nebula
 2004 – study coronal holes.

References

External links
 National Space Facilities Control and Testing Center, Yevpatoria

Radio telescopes
Deep Space Network
Astronomical observatories built in the Soviet Union
Soviet and Russian space program locations
Space program of the Soviet Union
Buildings and structures in Crimea
1960 establishments in the Soviet Union